Across Two Oceans is a neo-classical music album by Tim Janis, released in 2003. The album peaked at #7 on the Top New Age Albums chart.

Track listing
The Sea on Every Side of the Mountain" – 3:10
"Where the Earth Touches Mars" – 3:01
"With Gathering Wonder Comes Intense Pain" – 2:36
"For Only a Moment She Defies Gravity (Piano Reprise)" – 2:44
"To a Waiting Heart Comes a Transplant " – 3:37
"Echo Lake (Echo Lake)" – 4:06
"Endless and Ever Beautiful and Ugly" – 2:36
"Somewhere and Beyond the Rainbow" – 2:50
"Harvest Moon and Sun (Piano Reprise)" – 2:24
"Across Two Oceans and Five Lakes" – 2:23
"Beneath the Distance in an Instance" – 2:37
"Ocean Off Diamonds with Rubies" – 3:16
"Summer Wind and Tornadoes" – 2:34
"Spring Point Light" – 3:04

Personnel
Cinnamon Creeden – flute, penny whistle
Keith Foley – fretless bass
Andy Happel – acoustic guitar
Peter Janis – executive producer
Tim Janis – synthesizer, piano
Shan Jiang – violin
Scott Kennedy – percussion
Sergei Kogut – violin
Janice Martin – violin
Paul Stubblebine – mastering

References

2004 albums
Tim Janis albums